The Liverpool Blues was an Australian rules football team in Liverpool, England, which competed in the British Australian Rules Football League.

History
The Blues formed in 1993 to play in the British Australian Rules Football League. The club played only one full season, folding shortly after the 1994 home and away series began.  The Blues were associated with the local Sefton Rugby Club.

A new club was later formed in 2002 in the nearby town of St Helens, known as the St Helens Miners.  The club was renamed as the Northwestern Miners for the 2004 season, before they also folded.

The Liverpool Eagles were formed in late 2008, bringing the sport back to the city.

See also

References

External links

Australian rules football clubs in England
1993 establishments in England
Australian rules football clubs established in 1993
1994 disestablishments in England
Australian rules football clubs disestablished in 1994